Cyperus longispicula is a species of sedge that is native to parts of south eastern Africa.

See also 
 List of Cyperus species

References 

longispicula
Plants described in 2004
Flora of Mozambique
Flora of Zimbabwe